Edmund Walter Sim (born 1966) is an international trade attorney and regular editorial contributor to the Singapore Straits Times and OpinionAsia on trade and diplomacy in ASEAN., as well as editing the ASEAN Economic Community blog A partner at Appleton Luff, he has participated in over 180 trade remedy (antidumping, countervailing duty, and safeguard) proceedings in both traditional jurisdictions such as the U.S., EU, Canada and Australia, as well as non-traditional jurisdictions such as Korea, China, Turkey, Indonesia, South Africa, India, Russia, the Philippines, Malaysia, Thailand and Singapore.  Sim has provided assistance to government trade ministries in Asia. Sim has participated in dispute resolution proceedings under the World Trade Organization, General Agreement on Tariffs and Trade, the North American Free Trade Agreement and the U.S.-Canada Free Trade Agreement. Sim represented companies in dealing with the economic integration of the ASEAN economies through the ASEAN Free Trade Agreement and other programs and teaches a course on this subject at the National University of Singapore law school.

Sim was the lead lawyer for the Vietnamese seafood industry in the U.S. antidumping investigation of frozen tra and basa fillets from Vietnam, the Malaysian and Philippine steel industries in the EU antidumping and antisubsidy investigations on stainless steel fasteners from Malaysia and the Philippines, as well as the Malaysian and Thai plastic industries in the U.S. and EU antidumping and antisubsidy investigations on plastic bags from Malaysia and Thailand.

Sim has served as vice chairman and treasurer of the Board of Governors of the American Chamber of Commerce, Singapore, a committee vice chair of the American Bar Association, Inter Pacific Bar Association, American Society of International Law and International Bar Association, and on the panel of FTA advisors maintained by the Singapore government.

Sim is a native of Ruston, Louisiana. His father is Yawsoon Sim, a professor of political science at Grambling State University, a historically black university. The elder Sim immigrated to the United States from Kuching, Malaysia. Sim received an A.B. degree magna cum laude in 1988 from Dartmouth College with Phi Beta Kappa honors, and a J.D. cum laude in 1991 from the University of Michigan Law School. While attending university, he worked for the Office of Vice President George H. W. Bush and the general counsel's office of the U.S. Department of Treasury.  Sim also worked at the Washington and Singapore offices of Hunton & Williams LLP, White & Case LLP, Willkie Farr & Gallagher LLP and Patton Boggs LLP.

References

20th-century Singaporean lawyers
Dartmouth College alumni
University of Michigan Law School alumni
People from Ruston, Louisiana
Singaporean people of Chinese descent
Living people
1966 births
People associated with Willkie Farr & Gallagher
21st-century Singaporean lawyers